Wilhelm Törsleff (November 26, 1906 – January 18, 1998) was a Swedish sailor who competed in the 1928 Summer Olympics.

In 1928 he was a crew member of the Swedish boat Sylvia which won the bronze medal in the 8 metre class.

External links 
 

1906 births
1998 deaths
Swedish male sailors (sport)
Olympic sailors of Sweden
Olympic bronze medalists for Sweden
Olympic medalists in sailing
Medalists at the 1928 Summer Olympics
Sailors at the 1928 Summer Olympics – 8 Metre